Chandragiri is a municipality in Kathmandu District in Bagmati Province of Nepal that was declared as municipality on 2 December 2014 by merging the former Village Development Committees Baad Bhanjyang, Balambu, Dahachok, Mahadevsthan, Machhegaun, Matatirtha, Naikap Naya Bhanjyang, Naikap Purano Bhanjyang, Satungal, Thankot and Tinthana. The urban administration is located in Old-Balambu. The city's main attractions include Chandragiri Hill, Nepal with its Cable Car.

Population
Chandragiri municipality has a total population of 85,195 according to 2011 Nepal census.

References

External links
Chandragiri

Populated places in Kathmandu District
Nepal municipalities established in 2014